Astarud (also Romanized as Astarūd, Asterūd, and Esterūd) is a village in Bizineh Rud Rural District, Bizineh Rud District, Khodabandeh County, Zanjan Province, Iran. At the 2006 census, its population was 933, in 201 families.

References 

Populated places in Khodabandeh County